Supper at Emmaus may refer to one of three autograph works by Rembrandt:
 Supper at Emmaus (Rembrandt, Musee Jacquemart-Andre), painting, 1628
 Supper at Emmaus (Rembrandt, Louvre), painting, 1648
 Supper at Emmaus (Rembrandt etching), etching, 1654

A further studio work (1648) is in the National Gallery of Denmark.